Bhatsana is a village situated in Rewari district, India.

Demographics
As of 2011 India census, Bhatsana had a population of 2777 in 535 households. Males (1448) constitute 52.14%  of the population and females (1329) 47.85%. Bhatsana has an average literacy(1856) rate of 66.83%, lower than the national average of 74%: male literacy(1084) is 58.4%, and female literacy(772) is 41.59% of total literates (1856). In Bhatsana, 14.11% of the population is under 6 years of age (392).

References 

Villages in Rewari district